The Public Order Act 1963 (c. 52) is an Act of the Parliament of the United Kingdom.

Changes to penalties and mode of trial

Section 1(1) increased the penalties to which a person guilty of an offence under section 5 of the Public Order Act 1936 (conduct conducive to breach of the peace) or under section 1(1) of the Public Meeting Act 1908 (endeavouring to break up meetings) was liable. It also provided that the offence under the Public Order Act 1936 was to become triable on indictment. It provided that a person guilty of either of those offences was liable on conviction on indictment, to imprisonment for a term not exceeding twelve months or to a fine not exceeding £500, or to both, or on summary conviction, to imprisonment for a term not exceeding three months or to a fine not exceeding £100, or to both. This did not apply to offences committed before 31 July 1963.

Consequential amendments

Section 1(2) effected consequential amendments to section 7(2) of the Public Order Act 1936 and section 1(1) of the Public Meetings Act 1908 which had previously specified the penalty and mode of trial for those two offences.

See also
Public Order Act

References

United Kingdom Acts of Parliament 1963